Adad-nārārī I, rendered in all but two inscriptions ideographically as mdadad-ZAB+DAḪ, meaning “Adad (is) my helper,” (1305–1274 BC or 1295–1263 BC short chronology) was a king of Assyria during the Middle Assyrian Empire. He is the earliest Assyrian king whose annals survive in any detail. Adad-nārārī I achieved major military victories that further strengthened Assyria.  In his inscriptions from Assur  he calls himself son of Arik-den-ili, the same filiations being recorded in the Nassouhi kinglist. He is recorded as a son of Enlil-nirari in the Khorsabad kinglist and the SDAS kinglist, probably in error.

Early rule 

He boasted that he was the “defeater of the heroic armies of the Kassites (their Babylonian neighbors to the south), Qutu (their eastern Gutean neighbors), Lullumu (the Lullubi tribesmen of Ancient Iran immediately east of Assyria) and Shubaru (“northerners in Asia Minor”). Pacifier of all enemies above and below.” The defeat of Nazi-Maruttaš’ Kassite forces must have been particularly sweet as his father “could not rectify the calamities inflicted by the king of the Kassite lands,” during his reign. It took place at the town of Kār Ištar in the province of Ugarsulu and victory was assured when Adad Nirari's army fell on the Kassite camp “like a devastating flood,” as described gloatingly by Tukulti-Ninurta I in his eponymous epic, plundering and carrying off his royal standard. This triumph resulted in a border realignment with Assyria extending its territory south, into Pilasqu, the city of Arman in Ugarsallu and Lullumu.

Nazi-Maruttaš’ successor, Kadašman-Turgu was sufficiently motivated to secure peace that he seems to have agreed to a humiliating treaty with Adad Nirari where “he pardoned his (Nazi-Maruttaš’) son of the crime,” twice.

Relations with Mitanni and Hittites 
This allowed the Assyrians to turn their attention to the conquest of the Mitanni. Under Shattiwaza, Hanigalbat (a remnant of the Mitanni empire) had become a vassal state of the Hittite empire, celebrated with a treaty, as a buffer to the ascendant Assyrians. But treaties were between individual kings during the late bronze age as nation states had yet to emerge and with the accession of Shattuara I in Hanigalbat and Urhi Teššup as Mursili III of the Hittites and a waning of Hittite engagement in international affairs, the former may have sought to adopt a more independent position. 

According to Adad-nārārī, conflict was triggered by Shattuara’s preemptive attack which resulted in the defeat and capture of the Mitanni king Shattuara, who was taken to Aššur and forced to swear fealty as a vassal of the Assyrians, apparently without the intervention of the Hittites, providing regular tribute for the remainder of his reign. 

Bolstered by his military victories, Adad-nārārī pronounced himself šar kiššati, “king of the universe,” in imitation of his ancient predecessor Shamshi-Adad I, and impertinently greeted his Hittite counterpart on equal terms as a fellow “great king.” He invited himself to visit Amman Mountain (Amanus, a cult center perhaps?) in his “brother’s” territory, drawing a scathing put down from Hittite king Mursili III (Urhi Teššup),

By the time Hittite king Hattusili III (c. 1267–1237 BC) overthrew Urhi Teššup, the conquest was a fait accompli and a sheepish Hattušili was to request that Adad-nārārī intervene to curb the incursions of the people of Turira, a Hanigalbat frontier town, against those of Carchemish, still a loyal Hittite vassal, 

“If Turira is yours, smash it!... If Turira is not yours, write to me so that I may smash it. The possessions of your troops who are dwelling in the city shall not be claimed.” 

Hattušili's main complaint, however, was the breach in protocol caused when Adad-nārārī snubbed his inauguration: 

“It is the custom that when kings assume kingship, the kings, his equals in rank, send him appropriate [gifts of greeting]. Clothing befitting kingship, and fine [oil] for his anointing. But you did not do this today.” 

Hattušili was at great pains to placate his Assyrian counterpart following the “sad experiences” encountered by his envoys in their dealings with his predecessor and call on Adad-nārārī to confirm with his own envoy, Bel-qarrad, that he had been treated well by Hattušili. Although still in the Bronze Age, iron was not unknown and Hattušili goes on to discuss Adad-nārārī's request for the metal:

Conflict with Hanigalbat resumed when Shattuara's son, Wasashatta, rebelled and engaged with the Hittites for support. Adad-nārārī was later to gloat that the Hittites took his gifts but gave nothing in return when he (Adad-nārārī) counterattacked, sacking and plundering the cities of Amasaku, Kahat, Shuru, Nabula, Hurra, Irridu, Shuduhu and Washshukanu, places largely as yet unidentified, destroying the city of Taite (Taida) and sowing kudimmus over it. 

The denouement took place at Irridu (Ordi?) where Wasashatta was captured and, along with his extended family and court, deported in fetters to Aššur where he vanished from history. Adad-nārārī annexed the kingdom of Hanigalbat, enslaved its people, and appointed a governor drawn from the Assyrian aristocracy. While the name of this individual is unknown, one of his successors, during the later reign of Šulmanu-ašaredu, was Qibi Assur who founded a short dynasty of Assyrian viceroys ruling over this region.

Governance 
The seat of Assyrian governance was possibly Wasashatta's former capital, Taida, because his monumental steles recounted that it “had become dilapidated and (he) removed its debris. (He) restored it,” rebuilding the palace replete with a suitably boastful commemorative inscription prepared but never installed as it was found in the ruins of Assur. His building restorations in the city of Assur were celebrated in monumental inscriptions and include the Step Gate of the temple of the god Ashur, various of the city's walls, its quay along the river Tigris, the temple of Ishtar and the storehouses of the gate of An and Adad.

His reign lasted for 31 years, but only around 12 Limmu officials, from the Assyrian Eponym dating system have been identified, primarily from monumental inscriptions, and these include Shulmanu-qarradu, Andarasina, Ashur-eresh, variant Ashur-erish (son of Abattu), Ana-Ashur-qalla (officer of the palace), Iti-ili-ashamshu, Sha-Adad-ninu, Qarrad-Ashur, Assur-dammiq, Sin-n[a....], Ninurta-emuqaya, Bābu-aḫa-iddina and Adad-šumu-lesir, the eponym in whose year he died. Bābu-aḫa-iddina was a high-ranking official, some sources say “chancellor,” son of Ibassi-ili, who served under Adad-nārārī and his two successors. He celebrated his eponym year towards the end of Adad-nārārī's reign as attested in texts relating the activities of Assur-kasid son of Sin-apla-eris at Billa. His archive, called “archive 14410,” consisting of 60 tablets was found in a tomb under a house in Assur.

A bronze sword of Adad-nārārī I can be seen in the Metropolitan Museum of Art.

The Adad-nārārī epic

This historical epic is extant in four fragments and concerns the conflict between Adad-nārārī and his Babylonian contemporary Nazi-Maruttash, with whom he clashes and ultimately vanquishes in battle. The surviving pieces do not allow for a detailed narrative to be reconstructed. They do, however, suggest a sequence of events, where Adad-nārārī harks back to the setbacks faced by his father, “the seed of the men has disappeared forever,” his petitioning of the god Šamaš, “O Šamaš you are the true judge,” in preparation for his denouement with “the unjust Kassite king,” and so on.

Inscriptions

Notes

References

External links
Assyrian origins: discoveries at Ashur on the Tigris: antiquities in the Vorderasiatisches Museum, Berlin, an exhibition catalog from The Metropolitan Museum of Art Libraries (fully available online as PDF), which contains material on Adad-nirari I

13th-century BC Assyrian kings
13th-century BC deaths
Year of birth unknown
Kings of the Universe